Rahnishk (also Romanized as Rahnīshk, Rahanīshk, and Rahneshk; also known as Rahneg and Ranishk) is a village in Kahshang Rural District, in the Central District of Birjand County, South Khorasan Province, Iran. At the 2016 census, its population was 82, in 28 families.

References 

Populated places in Birjand County